The History of Song or Song Shi is one of the official Chinese historical works known as the Twenty-Four Histories of China that records the history of the Song dynasty (960–1279). It was commissioned in 1343 and compiled under the direction of First Minister Toqto'a and Prime Minister Alutu during the Yuan dynasty (1271–1368) at the same time as the History of Liao and the History of Jin. Running to a total of 496 chapters, the History of Song includes biographies of the Song Emperors along with contemporary records and biographical sketches of Song dynasty politicians, soldiers and philosophers.

Publication process
Kublai Khan endorsed a proposal by Liu Bingzhong and Wang E (1190–1273) for the compilation of historic records of the Song, Jin, and Liao dynasties but the compilation effort stalled for some time. In March 1343, the third year of Ukhaantu Khan, Emperor Huizong of Yuan's Zhizheng Era, an Imperial edict ordered the creation of histories of the Song, Liao and Jin Dynasties. Under the overall supervision of Toktogan, Temür Daš (Chinese Tiemuertashi ), He Weiyi,, Zhang Qiyan, Ouyang Xuan, Li Haowen, Wang Yi and Yang Zongduan were given responsibility for the project with Woyuluntu, Taibuhua, Yu Wenzhuan, Gong Shidao, Yu Que, Jia Lu Wei Su and 23 others appointed as historiographers. Toktogan resigned in May 1344 to be replaced on the project by Prime Minister Alutu, even though the latter was not familiar with Chinese characters. The final book took only two and a half years to produce and was published in Zhejiang Province in 1346, the sixth year of the Zhizheng Era.

Content
The History of Song with its 496 chapters is the largest of the Twenty-Four Histories. It contains 47 chapters of Imperial biographies, 162 chapters covering Song dynasty records, 32 chapters of tables (showing genealogy, etc.) and 255 chapters of historical biographies. A work of enormous breadth, the History of Song contains more than 2,000 individual historical biographies, more than twice as many as the Old Book of Tang that chronicles the history of the Early Tang dynasty. In the section of the book covering Song dynasty records there are fifteen separate categories viz: astronomy, the system of five phases known as Wu Xing, the legal calendar, geography, rivers and water ways, Confucian rites, music, ceremonial weaponry and bodyguards, military dress, elections, government positions, consumer goods, the army and punishment together with art and culture. Altogether these chapters make up one third of the work. The historical biographies section of the History of Song is unsurpassed by any of the other Dynastic Histories; there are detailed descriptions of Song government structures from the central down to the local level. Sections covering consumer goods and the army are also well written with much more detail than found in the other Dynastic Histories. The fourteen chapters on consumer goods contain seven times the amount of information as the corresponding chapters of the Book of Tang. A total of seven chapters contain biographies of traitors and rebels including Cai Jing, Huang Qianshan, Qin Hui, Zhang Bangchang and Liu Yu.

Four chapters are dedicated to Confucian scholars feature individuals such as Cheng Hao, Cheng Yi, Zhang Zai, Zhou Dunyi, and Zhu Xi.

Chien includes a translation to English of the treatise on the salt monopoly contained in volumes 181–183. This treatise is the largest of the treatises in the Finance and Economics section. Chien also includes maps in English corresponding to the main administrative regions described in volumes 85–90 comprising the Geography section.

Evaluation 
The ideology behind the History of Song is that of Neo-Confucianism, with coverage of the Confucian doctrines of loyalty, righteousness and ethics regarding the well-known scholars Zhou Dunyi, Cheng Hao, Cheng Yi, Zhang Zai and Zhu Xi amongst others. No less than 278 individuals feature in the section on loyalty and righteousness. Qing dynasty historian Qian Daxin once said: "The History of Song esteems neo-confucianism, especially the school of Zhu Xi". Its compilation follows the principles of Confucian life. Fine logic and language is used to convey morality whilst eschewing utilitarianism. The book's style is also highly regarded and considered a model example. Wang Anshi's Xining Reforms are rejected by the History of Song whilst political reform campaigners including Lu Huiqing, Zeng Bu and Zhang Dun feature in the section on traitors and rebels; Shi Miyuan, however, despite his involvement in the suicide of Emperor Ningzong of Song's eldest heir, does not feature in this section or indeed the entire History of Song. Famous general Wang Jianzai, regardless of his valiant combat record, is also omitted as are many other individuals involved in Mongol defeats by the Song.

Despite both the History of Song and the History of Jin being completed at the same time they are different in many ways. the History of Song records Yue Fei emerging victorious from every battle with the Jin dynasty, yet the History of Jin barely mentions Emperor Taizu of Jin's capture of Bozhou, Shunchangfu, Ruzhou and Songzhou when Yue Fei and other commanders withdrew from the battle. Information in the History of Song regarding Yue Fei all comes from a work by his descendant Yue Ke's Eguo Jintuo Zuibian (literally: 'Record of the Jin in Hubei'), the reliability of which is questioned by some sources, for example whether the Battle of Yancheng really was a great victory for the Song and if the claim regarding Yue Fei's twelve gold medals is true. Furthermore, there remains the issue of whether Yu Fei's troops left the people unharmed as is sometimes claimed. Qing dynasty poet and historian Zhao Yi covers this in his Twenty-two Historical Sketches under a section regarding observations on the Song and Jin armies.

Because the History of Song was prepared in a hurry and was the work of many editors, it contains a number of unavoidable errors and contradictions; for example, an individual with two biographical entries is Li Xijing, who appears in chapter 116 of the historical biographies section then again in chapter 222. The work also covers the Northern and Early Southern Song Dynasties in detail with only an outline of the later Southern Song dynasty. There are more biographies of individuals from the Northern Song period, for example the Wenyuan Zhuan covers a total of 96 people of which only 11 are from the Southern Song era. The History of Song is also considered the most disordered of the 24 Dynastic Histories. Zhao Yi comments: "When the Yuan dynasty wrote the history of the overthrown Song they probably just arranged preexisting Song texts." The Qing dynasty Siku Quanshu collection of books says that the "main purpose of the History of Song is as a tribute to the Song emperors and their Confucianism. Attention is not paid to other matters so there are a great number of errors". In 1977, Zhonghua Publishing issued a new version of the History of Song with corrections to the punctuation.

Later influence
Since the time of its publication, successive dynasties have produced commentaries on the History of Song. In 1546, Ming dynasty author Wang Zhu completed his 100 chapter Supplement to the History of Song to be followed in 1561 by Ke Weiqi's 200 chapter Songshi Xinbian and the 250 chapter Songshi Ji written by Wang Weijian.

During the Qing dynasty, Chen Huangzhong wrote the Songshi Gao running to 219 chapters. Chen Xinyuan produced the 40 chapter Songshi Yi.

In Korea, Jeongjo of Joseon wrote the Songshi Qian with 148 chapters. All these works correct some of the shortcomings of the History of Song but are no substitute for the original.

During the final years of the Qing Qianlong Emperor (r. 1735–1796 CE), historian Shao Jinhan along with Qian Daxin and Zhang Xuecheng worked to revamp the History of Song. Shao produced his Biographical sketch of the Southern Song, then went back to work on the History of Song but died before it was completed.

See also
History of the Song dynasty

Notes

References

Citations

Sources 

 
 

 Attribution
 This article is based on a translation of 宋史 in Chinese Wikipedia

External links 

 
 History of Song 《宋史》 Chinese text with matching English vocabulary

Yuan dynasty literature
Twenty-Four Histories
History books about the Song dynasty
14th-century history books